Theognis of Megara (Théognis ho Megareús) was a Greek lyric poet active in approximately the sixth century BC. The work attributed to him consists of gnomic poetry quite typical of the time, featuring ethical maxims and practical advice about life. He was the first Greek poet known to express concern over the eventual fate and survival of his own work and, along with Homer, Hesiod and the authors of the Homeric Hymns, he is among the earliest poets whose work has been preserved in a continuous manuscript tradition (the work of other archaic poets is preserved as scattered fragments). In fact more than half of the extant elegiac poetry of Greece before the Alexandrian period is included in the approximately 1,400 lines of verse attributed to him  (though several poems traditionally attributed to him were composed by others, e.g. Solon, Euenos). Some of these verses inspired ancient commentators to value him as a moralist yet the entire corpus is valued today for its "warts and all" portrayal of aristocratic life in archaic Greece.

The verses preserved under Theognis' name are written from the viewpoint of an aristocrat confronted by social and political revolution typical of Greek cities in the archaic period. Part of his work is addressed to Cyrnus, who is presented as his erōmenos. The author of the poems celebrated him in his verse and educated him in the aristocratic values of the time, yet Cyrnus came to symbolize much about his imperfect world that the poet bitterly resented:

In spite of such self-disclosures, almost nothing is known about Theognis the man: little is recorded by ancient sources and modern scholars question the authorship of most of the poems preserved under his name.

Life
Ancient commentators, the poems themselves and even modern scholars offer mixed signals about the poet's life. Some of the poems respond in a personal and immediate way to events widely dispersed in time.

Ancient sources record dates in the mid-sixth centuryEusebius dates Theognis in the 58th Olympiad (548–45 BC), Suda the 59th Olympiad (544–41 BC) and Chronicon Paschale the 57th Olympiad (552–49 BC)yet it is not clear whether Suda in this case means a date of birth or some other significant event in the poet's life. Some scholars have argued that the sources could have derived their dates from lines 773–82 under the assumption that these refer to Harpagus's attack on Ionia in the reign of Cyrus The Great.

Chronological evidence from the poems themselves is hampered by their uncertain authenticity. Lines 29–52, if composed by Theognis, seem to portray the political situation in Megara before the rise of the tyrant Theagenes, about the latter half of the seventh century, but lines 891–95 describe a war in Euboea in the second quarter of the sixth century, and lines 773–82 seem to refer to the Persian invasion of mainland Greece in the reign of Xerxes, at the end of the first quarter of the fifth century.

Even some modern scholars have interpreted those lines in that time-frame, deducing a birth date on or just before 600 BC, while others place his birth around 550 BC to fit in with the Persian invasion under either Darius or Xerxes.

There is confusion also about his place of birth, "Megara", which Plato for example understood to be Megara Hyblaea in Sicily, while a scholiast on Plato cites Didymus for the rival theory that the poet was born in a Megara in Attica, and ventures the opinion that Theognis might have later migrated to the Sicilian Megara (a similar theory had assigned an Attic birthplace to the Spartan poet Tyrtaeus).

Modern scholars in general opt for a birthplace in mainland Greek Megara though a suitable context for the poems could be found just about anywhere in archaic Greece and there are options for mix-and-match, such as a birth in mainland Megara and then migration to Sicilian Megara (lines 1197–1201 mention dispossession/exile and lines 783–88 journeys to Sicily, Euboea and Sparta).

The elegiac verses attributed to Theognis present him as a complex character and an exponent of traditional Greek morality. Thus for example Isocrates includes him among "the best advisers for human life", although all consider words of advice both in poetry and in prose to be most useful, they certainly do not derive the greatest pleasure from listening to them, but their attitude towards them is the same as their attitude towards those who admonish: for although they praise the latter, they prefer to associate with those who share in their follies and not with those who seek to dissuade them. As proof one could cite the poetry of Hesiod, Theognis and Phocylides; for people say that they have been the best advisers for human life, but while saying this they prefer to occupy themselves with one another's follies than with the precepts of those poets."Isocrates, To Nicocles 42–4, cited and translated by Douglas E. Gerber, Greek Elegiac Poetry, Loeb Classical Library (1999), page 171–3, yet Plato's Socrates cites some Theognidean verses to dismiss the poet as a confused and self-contradictory sophist whose teachings are not to be trusted, while a modern scholar excuses self-contradictions as typical of a lifelong poet writing over many years and at the whim of inspiration. The Theognidea might in fact be a collection of elegiac poems by different authors (see Modern scholarship below) and the "life" that emerges from them depends on which poems editors consider authentic.

Two modern authorities have drawn these portraits of Theognis, based on their own selections of his work:

Work

Transmission
It was probably his reputation as a moralist, significant enough to deserve comment by Aristotle and Plato, that guaranteed the survival of his work through the Byzantine period. However, it is clear that we do not possess his total output. The Byzantine Suda, for example, mentions 2800 lines of elegiacs, twice the number preserved in medieval manuscripts. Different scholars have different theories about the transmission of the text to account for the discrepancy. The surviving manuscripts of Theognis preserve an anthology of ancient elegy, including selections from other elegists such as Tyrtaeus; scholars disagree over which parts were written by Theognis. The collection is preserved in more than forty manuscripts, comprising a continuous series of elegiac couplets that modern editors now separate into some 300 to 400 "poems", according to personal preferences.

The best of these manuscripts, dated to the early 10th century, includes an end section titled "Book 2" (sometimes referred to as Musa Paedica), which features some hundred additional couplets and which "harps on the same theme throughout—boy love." The quality of the verse in the end section is radically diverse, ranging from "exquisite and simple beauty" to "the worst specimens of the bungler's art", and many scholars have rejected it as a spurious addition, including the philosopher Friedrich Nietzsche (see Nietzsche and Theognis below). However, many modern scholars consider the verses of Book 2 an integral part of the collection. The rest of the work also raises issues about authenticity, since some couplets look like lines attributed by ancient sources to other poets (Solon, Euenus, Mimnermus and Tyrtaeus). and other couplets are repeated with few or no changes elsewhere in the text. Ironically, Theognis mentions to his friend Cyrnus precautions that he has taken to ensure the fidelity of his legacy:

The nature of this seal and its effectiveness in preserving his work is much disputed by scholars (see Modern scholarship below).

Subject matter
All the poetry attributed to Theognis deals with subjects typically discussed at aristocratic symposiadrinking parties that had symbolic and practical significance for the participants:
 

Sympotic topics covered by Theognis include wine, politics, friendship, war, life's brevity, human nature, wealth and love. Distinctions are frequently made between "good" and "bad", a dichotomy based on a class distinction between aristocrats and "others", typical of the period but usually implicit in the works of earlier poets such as Homer—"In Theognis it amounts to an obsession". The verses are addressed to Cyrnus and other individuals of unknown identity, such as Scythes, Simonides, Clearistus, Onomacritus, Democles, Academus, Timagoras, Demonax and Argyris and "Boy". Poems are also addressed to his own heart or spirit, and deities such as Zeus, Apollo, Artemis, Castor and Pollux, Eros, Ploutos, the Muses and Graces.

Theognis also details the heightened political tensions within Megara during the seventh century. His works depict the arrival of "other men" that have challenged and displaced former members of the elite. His works, particularly lines 53-58, demonstrate that increasing urbanization among the rural populace surrounding Megara has resulted in heightened social pressures within the city. His writings are thought by modern scholars to largely represent the aristocratic viewpoint of the Megarian elite. However, it is difficult for modern scholars to ascertain both Theognis' position in Megarian society and his role in writing these lines due to possible later additions to his works and the confusion surrounding his origins.

Poetic style
Theognis wrote in the archaic elegiac style. An "elegy" in English is associated with lamentation. In ancient Greece it was a much more flexible medium, suitable for performance at drinking parties and public festivals, urging courage in war and surrender in love. It gave the hexameter line of epic verse a lyrical impulse by the addition of a shorter "pentameter" line, in a series of couplets accompanied by the music of the aulos or pipe. Theognis was conservative and unadventurous in his use of language, frequently imitating the epic phrasing of Homer, even using his Ionian dialect rather than the Dorian spoken in Megara, and possibly borrowing  inspiration and entire lines from other elegiac poets, such as Tyrtaeus, Mimnermus and Solon. His verses are not always melodious or carefully constructed but he often places key words for good effect and he employs linguistic devices such as asyndeton, familiar in common speech. He was capable of arresting imagery and memorable statements in the form of terse epigrams. Some of these qualities are evident in the following lines [425-8], considered to be "the classic formulation of Greek pessimism":

The lines were much quoted in antiquity, as for example by Stobaeus and Sextus Empiricus, and it was imitated by later poets, such as Sophocles and Bacchylides. Theognis himself might be imitating others: each of the longer hexameter lines is loosely paraphrased in the shorter pentameter lines, as if he borrowed the longer lines from some unknown source(s) and added the shorter lines to create an elegiac version. Moreover, the last line could be imitating an image from Homer's Odyssey (5.482), where Odysseus covers himself with leaves though some scholars think the key word  might be corrupted.<ref>see also J.M.Edmonds (ed.), 'Elegiac Poems of Theognis, Elegy and Iambus Vol.1, note 103, Persus Digital Library</ref> The smothering accumulation of eta sounds in the last line of the Greek is imitated here in the English by mound round.

Scholarship

 Classical 
According to Diogenes Laërtius, the second volume of the collected works of Antisthenes includes a book entitled Concerning Theognis. The work does not survive.

 Modern 

The collection of verses attributed to Theognis has no overall structure, being a continuous series of elegiac couplets featuring frequent, sudden changes in subject and theme, in which different people are addressed and even the speaker seems to change persona, voicing contradictory statements and, on a couple of occasions, even changing sex. It looks like a miscellaneous collection by different authors (some verses are in fact attributed elsewhere to other poets) but it is not known when or how the collection was finalized. Friedrich Gottlieb Welcker, sometime known as "the father of Theognidean criticism", was the first modern scholar to edit the collection with a view to separating authentic verses from spurious additions (1826), Ernest Harrison (Studies in Theognis 1902) subsequently defended the authenticity of the collection, and thus the scholarly world divided into two camps, which one recent scholar half-jokingly referred to as "separatists" and "unitarians" There have also been divisions within the camps. Separatists have agreed with Theodor Bergk (1843) that the collection was originally assembled as the work of Theognis, into which a large admixture of foreign matter has somehow found its way, or they have believed it was compiled originally as a textbook for use in schools or else as a set of aristocratic drinking songs, in which some verses of Theognis happen to be strongly represented. Quite recently Martin Litchfield West identified 306 lines as a core sequence of verses that can be reliably attributed to Theognis since they contain mention of Cyrnus and are attested by 4th century authorities such as Plato and Aristotle, though the rest of the corpus could still contain some authentic verses. West however acknowledges that the whole collection is valuable since it represents a cross-section of elegiac poetry composed in the sixth and early fifth centuries. According to another view, the quest for authentically Theognidean elegies is rather beside the point—the collection owes its survival to the political motivations of Athenian intellectuals in the 5th and 4th century, disappointed with democracy and sympathetic to old aristocratic values: "The persona of the poet is traditionally based, ideologically conditioned and generically expressed." According to this view, the verses were drinking songs in so far as the symposium was understood to be a microcosm of society, where multiple views were an aspect of adaptive behaviour by the embattled aristocracy, and where even eroticism had political symbolism: "As the polis envisaged by Theognis is degenerate, erotic relationships are filled with pain..."

In lines 19–22, the poet announces his intention of placing a "seal" on the verses to protect them from theft and corruption. The lines are among the most controversial in Theognidean scholarship and there is a large body of literature dedicated to their explanation. The 'seal' has been theorized to be the name of Theognis or of Cyrnus or, more generally, the  distinct poetic style or else the political or ethical content of the 'poems', or even a literal seal on a copy entrusted to some temple, just as Heraclitus of Ephesus was said once to have sealed and stored a copy of his work at the Artemisium.

 Friedrich Nietzsche 

Friedrich Nietzsche, the German philosopher, already studied the work of Theognis during his school days at Schulpforta, the subject of his thesis entitled De Theognide Megarensi, an activity which he continued during his studies at Leipzig University. His first published article (in an influential classical journal, Rheinisches Museum) concerned the historical transmission of the collected verses. Nietzsche was an ardent exponent of "catchword theory", which explains the arrangement of the Theognidean verses as pairs of poems, each pair linked by a shared word or catchword that could be placed anywhere in either poem, as for example in these pairs:
lines 1–10 ("child of God") and lines 11–14 ("daughter of God");
lines 11–14 ("daughter of God) and lines 15–18 ("daughters of God");
lines 15–18 ("word") and lines 19–26 ("words") etc.
However a later scholar has observed that the catchword principle can be made to work for just about any anthology as a matter of coincidence due to thematic association.

Nietzsche valued Theognis as an archetype of the embattled aristocrat, describing him as "...a finely formed nobleman who has fallen on bad times", and "a distorted Janus-head" at the crossroads of social change."Theognis appears as a finely formed nobleman who has fallen on bad times...full of fatal hatred toward the upward striving masses, tossed about by a sad fate that wore him down and made him milder in many respects. He is a characteristic image of that old, ingenious somewhat spoiled and no longer firmly rooted blood nobility, placed at the boundary of an old and a new era, a distorted Janus-head, since what is past seems so beautiful and enviable, that which is comingsomething that basically has an equal entitlementseems disgusting and repulsive; a typical head for all those noble figures who represent the aristocracy prior to a popular revolution and who struggle for the existence of the class of nobles as for their individual existence."from a biography of Nietzsche by Curt Paul Zanz, quoted and translated by Maudemarie Clark and Alan Swensen in their edition, On the Genealogy of Morality: a polemic, Hackett Publishing Company (1998), page 133 Not all the verses in the collection however fitted Nietzsche's notion of Theognis, the man, and he rejected Musa Paedica or "Book 2" as the interpolation of a malicious editor out to discredit him. In one of his seminal works, On the Genealogy of Morals, he describes the poet as a 'mouthpiece' of the Greek nobility: Theognis represents superior virtues as traits of the aristocracy and thus distinguishes (in Nietzsche's own words) the "truthful" aristocrat from the "lying common man".

 Charles Darwin 
Charles Darwin represented a widespread preference for a biological interpretation of such statements when he commented on the above lines thus:

Notes

References

Further reading

Easterling, P.E. (Series Editor), Bernard M.W. Knox (Editor), Cambridge History of Classical Literature, v.I, Greek Literature, 1985. , cf. Chapter 5, pp. 136–146 on Theognis.
Gärtner, Thomas, "Überlegungen zu den Theognideen", Studia Humaniora Tartuensia 8.A.1, 2007, 1–74.
 Highbarger, Ernest L., "A New Approach to the Theognis Question", Transactions and Proceedings of the American Philological Association, Vol. 58, (1927), pp. 170–198, The Johns Hopkins University Press
 Murray, Gilbert, A History of Ancient Greek Literature, 1897. Cf. Chapter III, The Descendants of Homer, Hesiod, Orpheus, p. 83 and on.
 Nietzsche, On Theognis of Megara, edited by Renato Cristi & Oscar Velasquez, Cardiff: University of Wales Press, 2015
 Selle, Hendrik, Theognis und die Theognidea (Berlin; New York: Walter de Gruyter, 2008) (Untersuchungen zur antiken Literatur und Geschichte, 95).
 This has a critical review of the poetry.

EditionsTheognidis Megarensis Poetae Vetvstiss, Ex officina. Chrisopori Plantini, Antwerp. 1572 (MDLXXXII) translation into Latin by Jakob Schegk
 August Immanuel Bekker (1815, 2nd ed. 1827)
 Friedrich Gottlieb Welcker (1826); both these are epoch-making books which no serious student can ignore
 Theodor Bergk (1843, 4th ed. 1882; re-edited by E. Hiller, 1890, and Otto Crusius, 1897);
 Jakob Sitzler (1880)
 Ernest Harrison, Studies in Theognis (1902)
 Thomas Hudson-Williams, The elegies of Theognis and other elegies included in the Theognidean sylloge (1910)
 Martin Litchfield West, Iambi et elegi graeci, vol. 1 (1971, revised edition 1989)
 Douglas Young (after Ernest Diehl), Teubner edition (1998) - 
 David Hayes, New Translations of Theognis in The Utopian 

External links

J.M.Edmonds (ed.) 'Elegiac Poems of Theognis', Elegy and Iambus Vol. 1, Greek with English translations, via '''Perseus Digital Library
Poems by Theognis of Megara English translations
Theognis of Megara Poems with complete table of contents

Ancient Greek erotic poets
Ancient Megarians
Pederasty in ancient Greece
6th-century BC Greek people
6th-century BC poets
Ancient Greek elegiac poets
Year of birth unknown
Year of death unknown